North Carolina's 7th Senate district is one of 50 districts in the North Carolina Senate. It has been represented by Republican Michael Lee since 2023.

Geography
Since 2023, the district has covered most of New Hanover County. The district overlaps with the 18th, 19th, and 20th house districts.

District officeholders since 1993

Election results

2022

2020

2018

2016

2014

2012

2010

2008

2006

2004

2002

2000

References

North Carolina Senate districts
New Hanover County, North Carolina